The Protestant Church in Senegal is a Christian denomination in Senegal.

The Paris Evangelical Missionary Society moved to Senegal in 1863 to do mission among Muslims. In 1974 the Protestant Church in Senegal was formed. There are currently four congregations, in Plateau, Dieuppeul, Saint-Louis and Casamance. Its members are mostly non-Senegalese.

The Protestant Church in Senegal is a member of the World Communion of Reformed Churches.

References

External links
Wayback Machine's last archived version of the Protestant Church in Senegal website

Members of the World Communion of Reformed Churches
Christian organizations established in 1974
Churches in Senegal